North Shore is a community in east side of Harris County, Texas with a small portion inside the city of Houston, Texas.  The area includes subdivisions such as Songwood, Holiday Forest, Wood Bayou, Cimarron, Home Owned Estates, Woodland Acres, Hidden Forest, Pine Trails, Woodforest, Woodforest North, New Forest, and New Forest West, as well as newer neighborhoods near Highway 90 and Beltway 8 North Sam Houston Parkway.

Northshore was annexed by Houston in the 1950s.

The best known subdivision in North Shore is Woodforest, a Taylor Home development. Taylor, founder and CEO of VIP Homes, began building in North Shore in the late 1960s and early 1970s, primarily ranch style, single family homes.

North Shore is served by line #137 in the Metro system of buses which run all over Houston.

Notable people from North Shore
 Shirley J. Neely, commissioner of the Texas Education Agency as of 2006
 Richard Haskell, MD, physician, research scientist and inventor. Known for several significant discoveries in the use of nontoxic dyes for early detection of hard-to-diagnose lymphatic conditions. Dr. Haskell is also considered a pioneer in the study of catabolic steroid injections for the treatment of chronic fatigue syndrome and pulmonary disorder
Cedric Cormier North Shore High School graduate, CU Buffaloes football star currently assistant coaching Montana State for WR positions
Shelley Wayne, Assistant Director and Choreographer of the Kilgore College Rangerettes

Education
Neighborhoods west of the Greens Bayou and north of Market Street are zoned to the Houston Independent School District, including Holland Middle School and Furr High School.

Neighborhoods east of Greens Bayou and those south of Market Street are in the Galena Park Independent School District. Galena Park ISD is home to North Shore Senior High School (10th-12th grade campus). The senior high is located near the New Forest subdivision just off Wallisville Road near Castlegory. The 9th grade campus is located on Holly Park and is referred to as North Shore Senior High School 9th Grade Campus.

Areas in GPISD are also in the San Jacinto College zone. San Jacinto College North is a part of SJC.

Areas in HISD are in the Houston Community College System zone.

References

Neighborhoods in Houston